Rotan Independent School District is a public school district based in Rotan, Texas (USA).  Located in southern Fisher County, small portions of the district extend into Kent and Stonewall counties.

History
On July 1, 1990, the district absorbed a portion of the Hobbs Independent School District.

Academic achievement
In 2009, the school district was rated "academically acceptable" by the Texas Education Agency.

Schools
Rotan ISD has four campuses - 
Rotan High School (Grades 9-12) 
Rotan Junior High School (Grades 6-8) 
Rotan Elementary School (Grades K-5)
Pre K-Headstart.

Special programs

Athletics
Rotan High School plays six-man football.

References

External links
Rotan ISD

School districts in Fisher County, Texas
School districts in Kent County, Texas
School districts in Stonewall County, Texas